Trevor Christie (born 28 February 1959) is an English footballer who played as a striker.

Christie was born in Newcastle upon Tyne, England, and began his career with Leicester City before joining Notts County in 1979. He enjoyed arguably his most successful years with County, winning promotion to the First Division in 1981. He was County's top scorer in the 1983–84 season, a season in which they were relegated.

He went on to play for Nottingham Forest, Derby County, Manchester City, Walsall, Mansfield Town, Kettering Town, Hucknall Town and Arnold Town.

External links
 

1959 births
Living people
English footballers
Leicester City F.C. players
Notts County F.C. players
Nottingham Forest F.C. players
Derby County F.C. players
Manchester City F.C. players
Walsall F.C. players
Mansfield Town F.C. players
Hucknall Town F.C. players
Arnold Town F.C. players
Kettering Town F.C. players
Association football forwards
Northern Counties East Football League players